Lundbreck Falls is a waterfall of the Crowsnest River located in southwestern Alberta, Canada near the hamlet of Lundbreck.

Visitors can view Lundbreck Falls from the observation platform as well as hiking to below the falls.

A day use area and an overnight campground are maintained at the falls site.

References

External links
 Alberta Parks Lundbreck Falls Provincial Recreation Area

Waterfalls of Alberta